The U.S. Army Combined Arms Support Command (CASCOM), a major subordinate command of the Training and Doctrine Command (TRADOC), is located at Fort Lee, Virginia. Under the CASCOM command is the Sustainment Center of Excellence (SCoE).

Mission 

CASCOM provides Training and Leader Development, and develops concepts, doctrine, organizations, lifelong learning, and materiel solutions, to provide Sustainment in support of a campaign quality Army with joint and expeditionary capabilities.

CASCOM is responsible for training more than 180,000 students annually through 541 courses taught by the Ordnance, Quartermaster and Transportation schools, Soldier Support Institute and Army Logistics University.

The establishment of the Sustainment Center of Excellence under CASCOM does not eliminate the duties and responsibilities of CASCOM Headquarters. CASCOM is a major subordinate element of the Training and Doctrine Command which trains and educates Soldiers and Civilians, develop and integrates capabilities, concepts and doctrine, and executes functional proponency to enable the Army's Sustainment Warfighting Function.

History 

The Combined Arms Support Command was established on 2 October 1990, when the U.S. Army Logistics Center (LOGC) at Fort Lee, Virginia merged with the U.S. Army Soldier Support Center at Fort Benjamin Harrison, Indiana. From 1973 to 1990 the U.S. Army Logistics Center was responsible for the development of logistics concepts and doctrine, the design of management systems, the control of management characteristics as they affected logistical support, the organization of logistics units, the career development of logistics personnel, and the conduct of logistics exercises and command post exercises.

On 10 October 1994, CASCOM was reorganized. The combat developments, doctrinal concepts, evaluation and standardization, and training developments functions at the Quartermaster, Ordnance and Transportation branch schools were centralized at CASCOM headquarters at Fort Lee, Virginia. The school brigades at these branch schools were now focused on branch-specific instruction.

In 2005, CASCOM underwent a realignment of the headquarters staff to meet new logistical requirements. Functions relating to training development came under the newly created Deputy Commander for Training. Materiel, force design and doctrine were consolidated under the Deputy Commander for Futures.

The 2005 Defense Base Closure and Realignment (BRAC) recommended the creation a Combat Service Support Center (consolidation of the Ordnance, Quartermaster, Transportation Centers and Schools) at Fort Lee. Under this BRAC the Transportation Center and School moves from Fort Eustis, Virginia, the Ordnance Center and School from Aberdeen Proving Ground, Maryland, and the Missile and Munitions Center from Redstone Arsenal, Alabama.

As a result of this BRAC action CASCOM Headquarters has taken on the additional role for providing oversight for the "Sustainment Center of Excellence". Under BRAC a new headquarters building was constructed as well as major construction projects in support of bringing the Ordnance and Transportation Schools to Fort Lee. As part of the creation of the SCoE, the Army Logistics Management College (ALMC) has become the Army Logistics University (ALU) where professional development training takes place for logistics officers, warrant officers, non-commissioned officers and civilians.

Subordinate commands 
 U.S. Army Ordnance Center and School
 U.S. Army Quartermaster Center and School
 U.S. Army Transportation Corps and School
 U.S. Army Soldier Support Institute
 United States Army Adjutant General School
 United States Army Financial Management School
 U.S. Army Recruiting and Retention School
 U.S. Army Logistics University

Commanders  
 1989–1992 Lieutenant General Leon E. Salomon
 1992–1994 Lieutenant General Samuel N. Wakefield
 1994–1996 Major General Thomas W. Robison
 1996–1997 Major General Robert K. Guest
 1997–1999 Major General Daniel G. Brown
 1999–2002 Lieutenant General Billy K. Solomon
 2002–2004 Major General Terry E. Juskowiak
 2004–2005 Major General Ann E. Dunwoody
 2005–2008 Major General Mitchell H. Stevenson
 2008–2010 Major General James E. Chambers
 2010 Brigadier General Jesse Cross
 2010–2012 Major General James L. Hodge
 2012-2014 Major General Larry D. Wyche
 2014 to 2015 Major General Stephen R. Lyons
 2015 to 2017 Major General Darrell K. Williams
 2017 to 2018 Major General Paul C. Hurley Jr.
 2018 Brigadier General Douglas M. McBride Jr. interim commander (23 August 2018)
 2018 to 2021 Major General Rodney D. Fogg
 2021 to present Major General Mark T. Simerly

Supporting sustainment units 
To provide a central location for Sustainment unit focused information on training, doctrine, lessons learned and force structure CASCOM has created the Sustainment Unit One Stop portal.

Insignia  

Shoulder Sleeve Insignia.

Symbolism: The five major elements of logistics (maintenance, supply, transportation, facilities and services) are represented by the discs. The four-pointed star alludes to the points of the compass, symbolizing global logistics application. Blue represents constancy and devotion; red stands for combat and courage. White stands for integrity and, with blue and red, represents the United States.
Background: The shoulder sleeve insignia was approved on 13 June 1991.

Distinctive Unit Insignia.

Symbolism: The star represents new unit bringing together diverse elements, combining their functions and activities under one authority. It also represents the United States of America. The ring stands for unity and cooperation, the corona denotes achievement and future growth. Blue represents constancy and devotion; red stands for combat and courage. White stands for integrity and, with blue and red, represents the United States. Gold signifies excellence.
Background: The distinctive unit insignia was approved 15 March 1991.

Flag 
The flag for the Combined Arms Support Command and Fort Lee is National flag blue with yellow fringe. The shoulder sleeve insignia is centered on the flag (TIOH drawing 5-1-307).

References

External links
 Combined Arms Support Command
 CASCOM News

Military logistics of the United States
Army Combined Arms Support Command
Army Combined Arms Support Command
1990 establishments in the United States